Shenshinovka is a rural locality (a selo) in Volokonovsky District, Belgorod Oblast, Russia. The population was 145 as of 2010. There are 2 streets.

Geography 
Shenshinovka is located 24 km northeast of Volokonovka (the district's administrative centre) by road. Repyevka is the nearest rural locality.

References 

Rural localities in Volokonovsky District